Seán Meade (born 1937 in Ballinasloe, County Galway) is an Irish former sportsperson. He played Gaelic football with his local club Ballinasloe and was a member of the Galway senior inter-county team in the 1950s and 1960s.

References

1937 births
Living people
Ballinasloe Gaelic footballers
Galway inter-county Gaelic footballers
Connacht inter-provincial Gaelic footballers